Gerstley is a former settlement in Inyo County, California.

Gerstley was founded around 1921, and named in honor of James Gerstley, Sr. by his business associate Francis Marion Smith who built the Tonopah and Tidewater Railroad.  Together with Richard C. Baker, the three men had formed Borax Consolidated, Ltd. in 1899.

References

History of the Mojave Desert region
Former settlements in Inyo County, California
Populated places in the Mojave Desert
Tonopah and Tidewater Railroad
Former populated places in California